Maurizio Peccarisi (born 17 February 1978) is an Italian footballer.

Career
Peccarisi started his career at Reggina. After reached semi-finals at 1999 Serie C1 promotion playoffs, he was signed by Ancona, which he won promotion to Serie B with club in 2000. After no appearances at 2002–03 season, he left for Arezzo at Serie C1 on loan in January 2003. In the next season, Peccarisi was not in the plan of Ancona which promoted to Serie A in 2003. In 2004, he joined Torino and finished as promotion playoffs winner, but unable to promote due to financial problems. He joined Triestina of Serie B which nearly relegated last season. In January 2006, he was signed by Rimini,  which the team saved from relegation with 2 more points. In the next season, Peccarisi along with teammate likes Digão, formed a good defensive line, and the team finished as the 5th. But Peccarisi himself injured in April 2007 and back to squad in October. With changes in squad, Rimini finished 7th in 2007–08 season. In mid-2008, he joined Salernitana at Serie B, which he played 19 time for the newly promoted side. He was injured and not played since March 2009.

On 15 September 2014 Peccarisi was signed by Pordenone.  On 13 January 2015 Peccarisi and Capogrosso moved to Venezia, with Raffaele Franchini and Emanuele Panzeri moved to opposite direction.

References

External links

2007-08 Profile at La Gazzetta dello Sport 
Profile at Football.it 
Profile at Salernitana 

1978 births
Living people
People from Bordighera
Italian footballers
Reggina 1914 players
Giulianova Calcio players
A.C. Ancona players
S.S. Arezzo players
A.C. Cesena players
Torino F.C. players
U.S. Triestina Calcio 1918 players
Rimini F.C. 1912 players
U.S. Salernitana 1919 players
U.S. Avellino 1912 players
Pordenone Calcio players
Venezia F.C. players
Association football fullbacks
Footballers from Liguria
Sportspeople from the Province of Imperia